The L'Abbé river is a tributary of the east bank of the Métabetchouane River, flowing in the municipalities of Saint-André-du-Lac-Saint-Jean and Chambord, in the Le Domaine-du-Roy Regional County Municipality, in the administrative region of Saguenay–Lac-Saint-Jean, in the province of Quebec, in Canada.

Forestry is the main economic activity in this area; recreational tourism, second.

The surface of the L'Abbé River (except the rapids zones) is usually frozen from the end of November to the beginning of April, however the safe circulation on the ice is generally done from mid-December to the end of March.

Geography 
The main watersheds adjacent to the L'Abbé River are:
North side: Métabetchouane River, MacDonald River, Lac Saint-Jean;
East side: la Belle Rivière, Couchepaganiche River;
South side: Métabetchouane River, rivière à la Carpe;
West side: Métabetchouane River, Grande rivière Désir, Bruyante River, Prudent River.

The L'Abbé River rises at the mouth of Lac L'Abbé (length:;). This lake, entirely surrounded by forest, has a marsh area near the mouth.

From the confluence of the L'Abbé river, the current descends the Métabetchouane River to the north on  crossing Martine Falls, to the south shore of Lac Saint-Jean; from there, the current crosses the latter on  towards the northeast, then borrows the course of the Saguenay River via la Petite Décharge on  until Tadoussac where it merges with the Saint Lawrence estuary.

Toponymy 
The toponym Rivière L'Abbé was formalized on December 5, 1968, at the Place Names Bank of the Commission de toponymie du Québec.

Notes and references

See also

Related articles 
 Saint-André-du-Lac-Saint-Jean, a municipality
 Chambord, a municipality
 Métabetchouane River
 Lac Saint-Jean, a body of water
 List of rivers of Quebec

Rivers of Saguenay–Lac-Saint-Jean
Le Domaine-du-Roy Regional County Municipality